The following is a list of programs broadcast by Raj TV

Currently broadcast

Retelecast
Savaale Samaali
Nilaivai Pidippom

Dubbed soap opera

Reality
24 Frames
Comedy Galatta
Masala Cafe
Isai Chakaravarthy MSV - Spl Documentary
Cinema Cafe
Thim Tharigida - Classic Dancer's Show
Thirai Vaanil
Super Samaiyal
Micro Cinema
Naanum Cinemavum - Interviews
Ka Ka Ga Po Comedy Skit
Kasumazhai – Game show
Gunamakkum Anbu
Jesus Calls
Cinema Paarvai
Kaiyalavu Ulagam

Formerly broadcast

Soap operas

Soap opera
 Kadal Kadandhu Udhyogam
 Gangadharanai Kanom
 Kannamma
 Hello Shyamala
 Nalam Nalam Ariya Aval

Other shows

 Beach Girls
 Tanishq Swarna Sangeetham
 Airtel Star Singer
 Gold Casino
 Tamil Pesum Kadhanayagi
 Super Dancer
 Chennaiyil Thiruvaiyaaru
 Go Skool
 Kaasu Malai
 Dhoom-Dare If You Can
 Endrendrum Ravikumar
 Rajageetham
 Masala Cafe
 Parambarai Vaithiyam
 Kollywood buzz
 Madhura Geetham
 Masala Cafe
 Movie Cafe
 Mega 10 Movies 
 Shivaji Rao To Kabali - A Story of the Legend

Awards
 Raj Mudhalavan Awards
 Raj Moodal Moovar
 Women Achiever Awards 2015
 MGR-Shivaji Tele Awards
 Abirami Awards 2016 Dubai

List of movies

Muthuramalingam
Semma Botha Aagathey
Dhoni Kabadi Kuzhu
Aaranyam
Savarikaadu
Achaaram
Ulagam Sutrum Valiban
Chinna Chinna Kannile
Sigamani Ramamani
Kadhalna Summa Illai
Mariyadhai
Magane En Marumagane
Minnale
Karnan (1964)
Adimai Penn (1969)
Neeya? (1979)
 Netrikkan (1981)
 Puthukavithai (1982)
Agni Sakshi (1982)
 Poikkal Kudhirai (1983)
 Naan Mahaan Alla (1984)
 Enakkul Oruvan (1984)
 Sri Raghavendrar (1985)
Sindhu Bhairavi (1985)
Velaikaran (1987)
 Achamillai Achamillai (1984)
 Kalyana Agathigal (1985)
 Punnagai Mannan (1986)
 Manathil Uruthi Vendum (1987)
 Unnal Mudiyum Thambi (1988)
 Pudhu Pudhu Arthangal (1989)
Oru Veedu Iru Vaasal (1990)
Vaaname Ellai (1992)
Jaathi Malli (1993)
Duet (1994)
Pudhiavan (1984)
Poovilangu (1984)
Vanna Kanavugal (1987)
Siva (1989)
Unnai Solli Kutramillai (1990)
Manal Kayiru (1983)
Aval Sumangalithan (1985)
Thirumathi Oru Vegumathi (1986)
Penmani Aval Kanmani (1988)
 Varavu Nalla Uravu (1990)
Nee Pathi Naan Pathi (1991)
 Anney Anney (1983)
 Sigaram (1991)
 Annaamalai (1992)
 Roja (1992)
Thenali
Varalaru
 Idaya Kovil (1985)
 Mouna Ragam (1986)
 Nayakan (1987)
 Agni Natchathiram (1988)
 Idhayathai Thirudaathe (1989)
 Anjali (1990)
 Thalapathi (1991)
 Raavanan (2010)
Neeya?
12B
Rajaraja Cholan
Nadodi Mannan
Enga Mama
Amara Kaaviyam
Vaanathaipola
Ninaivellam Nithya
Lorry Driver Rajakannu
Aruvadai Naal
Anand
My Dear Marthandan
Mannan
Kalaignan
Thalattu Ketkuthamma
Rajakumaran
Magic Magic 3D
Well Done
Ragasiya Police 115
Chinna Mul Periya Mul
Anbu
Nammavar
Uzhaippali
Kallazhagar
Madrasi
Akilan
Aavathellam Pennaale
Aayiram Muthangal
Nangooram
Ponmaanai Thedi
Deiva Kuzhandhai
Jeevanadhi
Siragadikka Aasai
Naan Pudicha Mappillai
Kizhakku Veluthachu
Anicha Malar
Anthi Mayakkam
Aayiram Pookkal Malarattum
Kashmir Kadhali
Chinna Poovai Killathe
Krishnan Vandhaan
Kannan Oru Kai Kuzhandhai
Enga Chinna Ponnu
Five Star
Enkitta Mothathe
Indru Mudhal
I Love You Da
Veerapandiya Kattabomman
Pudhiya Theerppu
Pudhu Varusham
Kasi Yathirai
Mannukkul Vairam
Thaaiku Oru Thaalaattu
Ilamai Kaalangal
Naan Paadum Paadal
Unnai Naan Santhithen
Udaya Geetham
Aayiram Pookkal Malarattum
Mangai Oru Gangai
Guru
Rajadhi Raja
Singaravelan
Anandha Kanneer
Marumagal
Saadhanai
Miruthanga Chakravarthi
Neethibathi
Imaigal
Oorum Uravum
Sandhippu
Uruvangal Maralam
Thyagi
Thunai 
ABCD
Garuda Saukiyama
Natchathiram
Shakalaka Baby
Maaran
Padai Veetu Amman
Gummalam
April Maadhathil
Mutham
Iravu Paadagan
Style
Kalatpadai
Julie Ganapathi
Kalvanin Kaadhali
Naam

References

Lists of Tamil-language television series
Lists of television series by network